Broussonetia is a genus of four species (including one hybrid species) of trees in the family Moraceae, native to eastern Asia. These four species have high-quality fiber which consist of more than 90% of cellulose. They are traditionally applied for various daily necessities in South Eastern Asia and papermaking in East Asia. 

One of these is the paper mulberry (Broussonetia papyrifera), whose bark fiber is used to make traditional paper in China, Korea, and Japan. This species has been widely introduced and has become invasive in some areas. Not only is paper mulberry used for paper making, but also other species are widely used in paper industry in those three country history. In fact, paper mulberry is not a major source of their traditional paper at least in Korea and Japan. Major material fibers of Hanji (Korean paper) and Washi (Japanese paper) come from Broussonetia × kazinoki. Broussonetia × kazinoki is known as only hybrid in Broussonetia genus between B. monoica and B. papyrifera.

Fossil record
Five fossil fruits of †Broussonetia pygmaea have been extracted from borehole samples of the Middle Miocene freshwater deposits in Nowy Sacz Basin, West Carpathians, Poland.

References

External links

Flora of China: Broussonetia

Moraceae
Moraceae genera
Taxa named by Charles Louis L'Héritier de Brutelle